When You're Away is a 1959 album by jazz singer Carmen McRae, arranged by Luther Henderson. Frank Hunter was credited as the conductor on "Willingly (Melodie Perdue)" and "Two Faces in the Dark".

Track listing
"When You're Away"
"The More I See You"
"I Only Have Eyes for You"
"Willingly (Melodie Perdue)"
"If I Could Be With You (One Hour Tonight)"
"I'll Be Seeing You"
"I Concentrate On You"
"Ain't Misbehavin'"
"Ev'ry Time We Say Goodbye"
"When Your Lover Has Gone"
"I'm Glad There Is You"
"Two Faces in the Dark"

Reception
The initial Billboard magazine review from August 1959 wrote: "The gal hands the tunes a tasteful, clear delivery, and for the most part she sticks to a straight rather than in improvising tack. […] moody stuff with a good bit that's programmable for jocks."

References

1959 albums
Carmen McRae albums
Albums arranged by Luther Henderson
Kapp Records albums